Le Grand Méliès is a 1952 French short documentary film directed by Georges Franju about the life of the film pioneer Georges Méliès.

Cast
 Jeanne d'Alcy as Herself
 François Lallement as Narrator (voice)
 André Méliès as Georges Méliès
 Marie-Georges Méliès as Herself / also voice: narrator

References

External links

 

1952 films
1952 documentary films
1952 short films
French black-and-white films
Documentary films about film directors and producers
Films directed by Georges Franju
1950s French-language films
1950s short documentary films
French short documentary films
Georges Méliès
1950s French films